"Alien space bats" ("ASBs") is a neologism for plot devices used in alternate history to mean an implausible point of divergence.

Definition
"Alien space bats" originally was used as a sarcastic attack on poorly-written alternate histories seen as being implausible. The attacks are usually phrased as the need for "alien space bats" or by saying that the alternate history has gone into "ASB territory". The term eventually evolved into a reference to deus ex machina to create an impossible point of divergence. Examples include changes to the physical laws of nature, time travel, and advanced aliens interfering in human affairs. An example of the last change is Harry Turtledove's Worldwar series.

History
The term "alien space bats" was coined and popularized in the Usenet group soc.history.what-if. Alison Brooks (1959–2002), credited as the creator of the term, used it to debunk the possibility of a successful Operation Sea Lion by saying that Nazi Germany could successfully invade the United Kingdom across the English Channel only if they had the help of alien space bats.  Brooks regretted the use of the ASBs as a supernatural agency and preferred to restrict them to rhetoric.

S. M. Stirling credited Brooks with creating the term in the acknowledgments section of Dies the Fire in which he changed the laws of physics and also used the plot device to send Nantucket back in time in Island in the Sea of Time.  One character throughout Dies the Fire and its sequels believes the change to the laws of nature to have been done by an advanced alien race because the changes were finely tailored and refers to the race as alien space bats. In a review of Dies the Fire, Dale Cozort addressed the perceived implausibility of the novel by saying, "Just say to yourself, 'The elder gods or alien space bats took our toys away and that’s all there is to it.'" Paul Di Filippo often uses the term in reviewing the series. The term also appeared in John Birmingham's 2008 novel Without Warning. In the UK, "space bats" was a term used by Professor Denzil Dexter, a character in the television comedy series The Fast Show, first appearing in Series 1, Episode 5, broadcast on 10.25.94.

In popular culture
 In Ken MacLeod's Learning the World alien space bats actually appear as characters in the novel as an in-joke.
 The gaming magazine Pyramid published an article describing how someone could play as an alien space bat in a role-playing game.
 In Failbetter Games' browser game Fallen London, Victorian-era London is stolen by alien bats from space.
 Steven H Silver's story "Bats in The Bayou" features alien space bats invading Texas.

See also

Assiti Shards series
Jonbar hinge

References

External links

Interactive sites
 Alien Space Bats and Other Magic on the Alternate History Discussion Board.
 Alien Space Bats on the Alternate History FAQ page of the Alternate History Wiki
 Alien Space Bats Yahoo! Group

Non-interactive sites
 Alien Space Bats on Alternate History Books
 "The Original Alien Space Bats - Irony and Steal"—a fictional story featuring alien space bats by Alison Brooks

Alternate history
Narrative techniques
Nantucket series
Alternate history fandom
Science fiction terminology
20th-century neologisms